Steel Tiger Records is a record label based in Yorkshire, England. The label was founded in late 2006 by Steve Cobby and Sim Lister.

Steve Cobby was formerly half of the iconic electronic music duo Fila Brazillia, in addition to his many other musical aliases, most notably The Solid Doctor - with The Heights of Abraham and Mandrillus Sphynx these are to be found on Twentythree Records.

Sim Lister was a member of Sheffield band Chakk and now, with Steve Cobby, is in The Heights of Abraham and J*S*T*A*R*S.

In 2013 Steve Cobby provided the soundtrack for the Hull 'UK City of Culture 2017' bid film - 'This City Belongs to Everyone', produced by Nova Studios - on 20 November 2013 Kingston upon Hull, East Riding of Yorkshire was announced as the winning City, and so as UK City of Culture 2017.

Steel Tiger Records catalogue features the following artists and releases:

 The Solid Doctor - A New Gladstone Bag - album - ST019, 16 December 2013
 Chieftain - Till Everyman Is Free - EP - ST018, 9 December 2013
 The Cutler - Everyone Is Remixing Everything Else - remix album - ST017, 30 September 2013
 Chieftain - Out Of My Life - single - ST016, 5 August 2013
 The Cutler - Everything Is Touching Everything Else - album - ST015, 10 June 2013
 Hey, Rube! - Can You Hear Me Mutha? - album - ST013, 15 October 2012
 Chieftain - The War Bonnet EP - EP - ST014, 30 July 2012
 The Cutler - The Best Things In Life Aren't Things - album - ST012, 10 September 2012
 The Cutler - Black Flag - EP - ST011, 21 August 2009
 The Cutler - Cutler - album - ST010, 7 July 2008
 The Cutler - Cleaver - single - 2008
 The Cutler - Claymore - single - 2007
 The Cutler - Cinquedea - single - 2007
 The Cutler - Scimitar - single - 2007
 The Cutler - Pickaxe - single - 2007
 The Cutler - Epee - single - 2007
 The Cutler - Hacksaw - single - 2007
 The Cutler - Chandrahas - single - 2007
 The Cutler - Stiletto - single - 2007
 J J Fuchs - Stick It In The Middle - single - 2007
 Peacecorps - Bushfarmer - EP - 2007
 J*S*T*A*R*S - Put Me On A Planet - album - ST001CD, 18 September 2006

Steve Cobby and Stephen Mallinder record as Hey, Rube!.

Steve Cobby and Dave 'Porky' Brennand record as The Cutler.

Steve Cobby and DJ Adam Regan (Different Drummer, Leftfoot) record as Chieftain.

Steve Cobby and Sim Lister record as J*S*T*A*R*S.

Steve Cobby, Sim Lister and Jake Harries record as Heights of Abraham.

Steve Cobby and Rich Arthurs of Orgatronics record as Peacecorps.

Steve Cobby is J J Fuchs.

Steve Cobby is The Solid Doctor.

See also 
 List of record labels
 List of independent UK record labels
 List of electronic music record labels
 Fila Brazillia
 Pork Recordings
 Twentythree Records
 Cabaret Voltaire (band)

External links
 Official site for Steel Tiger and The Cutler
 Official microsite for The Cutler
 Rob da Bank - BBC Radio 1's Leftfield Show, playlist featuring The Cutler track, Hacksaw
 Gilles Peterson - BBC Radio 1, playlist featuring The Cutler track, Stiletto
 Lauren Laverne's national radio show (18 June 2013) on BBC Radio 6 Music, playlist featuring the Hey, Rube! track, Mengi Dem Disco Leggi
  "Hull's City of Culture bid film revealed to the public" - BBC News article,12 November 2013. Steve Cobby provided the soundtrack for this Hull 'UK City of Culture 2017' bid film - 'This City Belongs to Everyone', produced by Nova Studios

Record labels established in 2006
Electronic music record labels
British independent record labels